C3 Presents is a concert promotion, event production and artist management company based out of Austin, Texas. C3 also produces several multi-day festivals including Austin City Limits Music Festival in Texas, Voodoo Music + Arts Experience in New Orleans, and Lollapalooza in Chicago along with its six international editions.

History

C3  was founded by Charles Attal, Charlie Jones and Charlie Walker in 2007(2) and headquartered in Austin, TX, with offices in Los Angeles, Atlanta, and New Orleans. The company also promotes more than 1,100 concerts annual in arenas, casinos and clubs throughout North America.

In the Fall of 2014, Live Nation began talks to purchase a 51% stake in the Austin company’s events production and promotions businesses. At the time, C3 was largest independent concert promoter in the world. The deal was completed in December of that year.

Events
Annually, C3 Presents produces the following festivals:

 Auckland City Limits Music Festival 
 Austin City Limits Music Festival 
 Austin Food + Wine Festival 
 In Bloom Music Festival (Eleanor Tinsley Park, Houston) 
 Innings Music Festival (Tempe, Arizona)
 Lollapalooza USA 
 Lollapalooza Argentina 
 Lollapalooza Berlin 
 Lollapalooza Brazil 
 Lollapalooza Chile 
 Lollapalooza Paris 
 Lollapalooza Stockholm 
 Music City Food + Wine Festival (Nashville, Tennessee) 
 Oceans Calling Festival
 Shaky Beats Music Festival 
 Shaky Knees Music Festival 
 Sea.Hear.Now Festival
 Sydney City Limits Music Festival 
 Voodoo Music + Arts Experience (New Orleans, Louisiana) 

C3 also books and promotes over 1,000 shows nationwide, including Austin venues Stubb's BBQ (sole promoter), Emo's (C3 owned and operated) and Historic Scoot Inn (C3 owned and operated). C3 bought the rights to Australian festival Big Day Out in 2014 and hasn't run the event since 2015.

Artist management
In addition to promotion and production, C3 Presents also has an artist management division operating in New York City, Los Angeles, Denver, and Austin.  C3 Management has a current roster of over 50 musicians   including The Strokes, Phoenix, Lindsey Buckingham, Jack Harlow, Mt. Joy (band), The Revivalists, Justice, Modest Mouse, Madeon and The Lemon Twigs.  The company also maintains its own freestanding radio promotion, film/TV, digital, and creative staffs.

References

 Live Nation Entertainment
Talent and literary agencies